Andrew Bayes (born February 11, 1978) is a former American football punter who played college football at East Carolina University.

Early years
Bayes first attended Suitland High School in Forestville, Maryland before transferring to DeMatha Catholic High School in Hyattsville, Maryland.

College career
Bayes played for the East Carolina Pirates from 1996 to 1999. He was a consensus All-American in 1999. He led Division I-A football in punting average in 1999 with 48.06 yards per punt, which remains a Conference USA and East Carolina single-season record. Bayes was also named first-team Conference USA in 1999 and second-team Conference USA in 1998 and 1997. He played in the Senior Bowl in 1999. He was inducted into the ECU Athletics Hall of Fame in 2017.

Professional career
Bayes was rated the second-best punter in the 2000 NFL Draft by NFLDraftScout.com. After going undrafted, Bayes signed with the Detroit Lions in April 2000. He played for the Frankfurt Galaxy in 2001. He was signed by the San Francisco 49ers in January 2002. Bayes played for the Amsterdam Admirals in 2002.

References

External links
 Just Sports Stats
 College stats

Living people
1978 births
Players of American football from Maryland
American football punters
East Carolina Pirates football players
Detroit Lions players
Frankfurt Galaxy players
San Francisco 49ers players
Amsterdam Admirals players
All-American college football players
People from Hyattsville, Maryland